Rodwayella is a genus of fungi within the Hyaloscyphaceae family. The genus contains four species.

References

External links
Rodwayella at Index Fungorum

Hyaloscyphaceae